Kannukku Kannaga is a 2000 Indian Tamil-language film directed by S. Dhayalan. It stars Murali, Devayani, Vindhya and Raja.

Plot 
Dharma (Murali) and Devi (Devayani) are siblings. Although Devi is in love with Arun (Raja), she cannot marry him because an astrologer (Charuhasan) predicted that a son born to them would result in the Dharma's death, but Dharma still accepts their marriage.

A few months later, Devi gives birth to Vijay (Master Vasanth), which triggers Dharma's death count. To save Dharma, Vijay must die, so Devi and Vijay poison themselves while Dharma is sleeping. Vijay records this on a tape and places it near Dharma, who listens to the tape and searches for them. While looking for Devi and Vijay, Dharma is hit by an arrow. He finds Vijay and Devi and takes them to the hospital to save their lives. Both Vijay and Devi are saved, but Dharma's condition becomes critical. His heart stops, but the doctors manage to resuscitate him with CPR.

Cast 
 Murali as Dharma
 Devayani as Devi
 Raja as Arun
 Vindhya as Selvi
 Vadivelu as Velu
 Charuhasan as Astrologer
 Anu Mohan as Arun's father
 Master Vasanth as Vijay
 Kumarimuthu as Perumal

Production 
Director Dhayalan had earlier worked as an assistant to K. S. Ravikumar, after having been recommended to his team by R. B. Choudary. Producer Henry and Dhayalan initially approached Sathyaraj for the lead role, but the actor cited being tired of village-centric roles. Later Vijayakanth and Sarathkumar refused the film citing date issues. Through cinematographer Thangar Bachan, the team alter approached Murali.

Soundtrack 

The film score and the soundtrack were composed by film composer Deva. The soundtrack, which was released in 2000, features five tracks with lyrics written by Vaali, Muthulingam, Kalidasan, and Nandalala.

Reception 
Savitha Padmanabhan of The Hindu Newspaper said: "This domestic drama suffers because of the lack of originality and exaggerated sentiments."

References 

2000 films
2000s Tamil-language films
Indian drama films
Films scored by Deva (composer)